The following are the football (soccer) events of the year 1916 throughout the world.

Events
Numerous national championships in Europe are suspended for the duration of the First World War, with a notable exception of the Netherlands, which continues throughout the hostilities.
25 April: Football Association of Thailand founded.
Thailand: Army United F.C. is founded.

Winners club national championship
Argentina: Racing Club
Austria: Rapid Vienna
Belgium: no national championship
Denmark: KB
England: no national championship
France: no national championship
Germany: no national championship
Hungary: no national championship
Iceland: Fram
Italy: no national championship
Luxembourg: US Hollerich
Netherlands: Willem II
Paraguay: Olimpia
Scotland:
Division One – Celtic
Scottish Cup – No competition
Sweden: AIK
Uruguay: Nacional
Greece: 1913 to 1921 - no championship titles due to the First World War and the Greco-Turkish War of 1919-1922.

International tournaments
 South American Championship 1916 in Argentina (July 2, 1916 – July 17, 1916)

Births

Deaths

Clubs founded 
 Army United F.C.
 RCD Mallorca

References 

 
Association football by year